Củ Chi is a rural district of Ho Chi Minh City, Vietnam.

Etymology
The Vietnamese word Củ Chi is derived from the old Mon-Khmer words Tonle Sre (ទន្លេស្រែ, "river of rice-field") or Sre (ស្រែ "rice field").

History
During the Vietnam War from 1967, Củ Chi Base Camp served as base for the 269th Aviation Battalion of the United States Army.

It is famous for its Củ Chi tunnels, which were constructed during the Vietnam War, and served as headquarters for the Viet Cong. Today, the district has many industrial zones.

, the district had a population of 355,822. It covers an area of 435 km². The district capital lies at Củ Chi Town.

Administration
The district consists of 1 town, Củ Chi Town (also the district capital), and 20 communes:

Communes:

See also
Củ Chi tunnels

References

Districts of Ho Chi Minh City